Protopresbyter Michael Ivanovich Pomazansky (November 7, 1888 – November 4, 1988) was a Russian theologian.

Biography 
He was born in the village of Koryst, in the governorate of Volhynia. His father was Archpriest Ioann Pomazansky who was the son of Father Ioann Ambrosievich. Fr. Michael's mother, Vera Grigorievna, was the daughter of a protodeacon and later priest in the city of Zhitomir. From 1920 until 1934 Fr. Michael taught Russian philology, literature, philosophical dialectics and Latin at the Russian lycée in Rivne.

In 1936 Fr. Michael was ordained a priest and moved to Warsaw where he was the first assistant to the rector, a position he held until June, 1944.

Upon his arrival in America in 1949, Fr. Michael was appointed by Archbishop Vitaly (Maximenko) as an instructor at Holy Trinity Orthodox Seminary in Jordanville, New York. After the death of his wife, he moved into the monastery, where he remained until his death on November 4, 1988.

Father Michael Pomazansky was known for his adherence to the teaching of dogmatic theology as a way to maintain understanding and unity within the various Orthodox communities. The work that he is most remembered for indeed named after this percept: Orthodox Dogmatic Theology.

Bibliography
 Orthodox Dogmatic Theology: A Concise Exposition by Protopresbyter Michael Pomazansky, St Herman of Alaska Brotherhood Press, 1994

See also
 Glorification
 Seraphim Rose
 Vladimir Lossky
 Eucharistic theologies contrasted
 Consecration
 Canonization
 Dumitru Stăniloae

External links
 ROCOR bio
 Online text copy of Orthodox Dogmatic Theology: A Concise Exposition in English as translated by Seraphim Rose 

1888 births
Russian theologians
Russian Orthodox Christians from Russia
Eastern Orthodox theologians
1988 deaths
Priests of the Russian Orthodox Church Outside of Russia
White Russian emigrants to the United States
20th-century Eastern Orthodox priests
20th-century Eastern Orthodox theologians